is a subway station on the  in Taitō, Tokyo, Japan, operated by the Tokyo subway operator Tokyo Metro.

Lines

Station layout
The station has one island platform serving two tracks on the second basement ("B2F") level. Track 1 serves -bound trains, while Track 2 serves -bound trains.

Platforms

History
The station opened on 28 March 1961.

The station facilities were inherited by Tokyo Metro after the privatization of the Teito Rapid Transit Authority (TRTA) in 2004.

Passenger statistics
In fiscal 2011, the station was used by an average of 42,317 passengers daily.

Surrounding area
The following stations are situated nearby:
 Ueno Station (/)
 Ueno-okachimachi Station
 Okachimachi station (Keihin-Tohoku Line/Yamanote Line)

On March 16, 2009, Naka-okachimachi Station was connected to Keisei Ueno Station, and a transfer passage was opened.

See also
 List of railway stations in Japan

References

External links

 

Railway stations in Tokyo
Stations of Tokyo Metro
Railway stations in Japan opened in 1961